Dag Stokke (1 April 1967 – 27 April 2011) was a Norwegian keyboardist, church organist and mastering engineer best known for his work with the Norwegian rock bands TNT and Vagabond. He owned an online mastering service called OnlineMastering.

Career 
Stokke was TNT's live keyboardist from April 1987 to 2011 and played on every TNT album from Realized Fantasies (1992) to A Farewell to Arms (2010). However, he was never a permanent TNT member. "I'm cool with my position in TNT," he said in a 2010 interview, "Some people ask me why I'm not in the pictures and why I'm not profiled. That's just the way it is, and I'm completely laidback with that. I got to experience the rockstar existence so much in 1987 and especially in 1989 and a little bit into 1992, so that dream has been realized. If I'm not upfront, that's totally cool, because I know I've been a part of all this." He played his last concert with TNT in Umeå, Sweden on 5 March 2011.

In January 2011 he found out he had cancer. Stokke died on 27 April 2011 at the age of 44. He is survived by a son.

Discography

TNT
 Realized Fantasies (1992)
 Three Nights in Tokyo (1992)
 Firefly (1997)
 Transistor (1999)
 My Religion (2004)
 All the Way to the Sun (2005)
 Live in Madrid (2006)
 The New Territory (2007)
 Atlantis (2008)
 A Farewell to Arms (2010)

VagabondVagabond (1994)A Huge Fan of Life (1995)

Other artists
Jorn - Starfire (2000)
Unni Wilhelmsen - Disconnected (2001)
Kristin Sevaldsen - Impressions (2007)
Arnstein Hammershaug - Langsomme dager (2009)
Kristin Sevaldsen and Lewi Bergrud - Treasure'' (2009)

References

External links
 Dag Stokke's personal page
 Magica Lanterna - Dag Stokke solo "Toccata" on YouTube

1967 births
2011 deaths
Norwegian keyboardists
TNT (Norwegian band) members
Deaths from cancer in Norway